Borgen may refer to:

Places
 Borgen, Akershus, Norway
 Borgen, Oslo, a neighborhood of Oslo, Norway
Borgen (station)
 Borgen, Østfold, a suburb of Sarpsborg, Norway
 Borgen, Ullensaker, Norway
 Borgen ('the castle'), colloquial name of Christiansborg Palace, Denmark
Börgen Bay, Antarctica

People
Bjørn Borgen (1937–2015), Norwegian footballer
Brett Borgen (1934–2014), Norwegian writer
Gustav Borgen (1865–1926), Norwegian photographer
Hans Borgen (1908-1983), Norwegian politician
Jesper Borgen (born 1988), Norwegian songwriter and producer
Johan Borgen (1902–1979), Norwegian writer
Kirsten Borgen (born 1957), Norwegian sport wrestler
Kjell Borgen (1939–1996), Norwegian politician
Marianne Borgen (born 1951), Norwegian politician
Nick Borgen (born 1952), Norwegian–Swedish musician
Ole Edvard Borgen (1925–2009), Norwegian theologian
Bonky, Onno Borgen (1962–2003), Canadian musician
Peder Borgen (born 1928), Norwegian Methodist minister
Thomas Borgen (born 1964), Norwegian banker, CEO of Danske Bank
Will Borgen (born 1996), American ice hockey player
Jorunn Sundgot-Borgen (born 1961), Norwegian professor of sports medicine

Other uses
 Borgen (TV series), named after the colloquial name for Christiansborg Palace

See also